Trupanea diluta is a species of tephritid or fruit flies in the genus Trupanea of the family Tephritidae.

Distribution
Argentina.

References

Tephritinae
Insects described in 1911
Diptera of South America